Aindling is a market town in Aichach-Friedberg district, in Bavaria, southern Germany.

Partner cities
  Avord, France, since 1977
  Fürstenfeld, Austria

References

External links 
Aindling - Official site

Aichach-Friedberg